The Kantuta Expeditions were two separate expeditions on balsa rafts led by the Czech explorer and adventurer Eduard Ingris. 

The voyages were inspired by the Thor Heyerdahl's Kon-Tiki expeditions. The goal of the expeditions was to repeat the success of the Kon-Tiki and confirm Heyerdahl's thoughts about the migration of Peruvian people to Polynesia.

The first expedition, Kantuta I, took place in 1955/1956 and led to failure. In 1959 Ingris built a new balsa raft Kantuta II and tried to repeat the previous expedition. The second expedition was a success. Ingris was able to cross the Pacific Ocean on the balsa raft from Peru to Polynesia.

See also
Pre-Columbian rafts
William Willis, also rafted across the Pacific.

External links 
Raft Voyage, from High C's to High Seas
  Krajane

Replications of ancient voyages
Pre-Columbian trans-oceanic contact